D.A.V. (Post Graduate) College Dehradun is a government aided college in the city of Dehradun, Uttarakhand, India.

History 
The Arya Samaj evening school was transferred from Meerut to the valley of Dehradun in the year 1892. It was later developed into the D.A.V. School. It became Dayanand Anglo-Vedic Postgraduate College, Dehradun, in 1948.

Affiliation
Agra University-1948
HNB Garhwal University, Srinagar, Uttarakhand.

Faculties

Arts
Science
Commerce
Education
Law

Courses

Bachelor of Arts 
(Three-year degree course)
 Economics
 English Literature
 History
 Maths
 Drawing & Painting
 Indian Classical Music
 Geography
 Political Science
 Statistics
 Hindi
 Sociology
 Sanskrit
 Psychology
 Education

Bachelor of Science 
(Three-year degree course) 
Physics
Chemistry
Maths
Zoology
Botany
Statistics

Bachelor of Commerce 
All subjects

Bachelor of Laws 
Three-year degree course

Bachelor of Education
All subjects

Master of Arts
Two-year degree course
 Economics
 English Literature
 History
 Maths
 Drawing & Painting
 Geography
 Political Science
 Psychology
 Sociology
 Sanskrit
 Statistics
 Hindi
 Education

Master of Science
 Botany
 Zoology
 Physics
 Statistics
 Chemistry

Master of Commerce
All prescribed subjects

Notable alumni
 Bachendri Pal (First Indian Woman to climb Mount Everest)
Harbans Kapoor (8-Times and Current MLA for Dehradun Cantt. Constituency)
Ajay Kothiyal (Founder of Youth Foundation and member of AAP)
Sushil Chandra (Chief Election Commissioner of India)
Akhilesh Kumar Tyagi (Plant Biologist and Former Director of National Institute of Plant Genome Research)
 O.P. Bhatt (Chairman of Tata Steel, former chairman of the State Bank of India)

References

Colleges in India
Universities and colleges in Dehradun
Educational institutions established in 1948
1948 establishments in India
Universities and colleges affiliated with the Arya Samaj